The Fred Hoyle Medal and Prize was established in 2008 by the Institute of Physics of London for distinguished contributions to astrophysics, gravitational physics or cosmology. The medal is named after astronomer Fred Hoyle who formulated the theory of stellar nucleosynthesis. The medal is made of silver and accompanied by a prize and a certificate. The medal was awarded biennially from 2008 to 2016. It has been awarded annually since 2017.

Recipients of the medal and prize
The following have won the award:
2022: Erminia Calabrese, for observational cosmology using the Cosmic Microwave Background
2019: Gilles Chabrier, for a variety of astrophysical domains
2018: Hiranya Peiris, for cosmic structure
2017: Jane Greaves, for planet formation and exoplanet habitability
2016: Sheila Rowan, for laser interferometers
2014: Anthony Raymond Bell, for cosmic rays
2012: David H. Lyth, for particle cosmology
2010: Carlos S. Frenk, for cold dark matter modelling
2008: Michael Rowan-Robinson, for infrared and submillimetre astronomy

See also
 Institute of Physics Awards
 List of physics awards
 List of awards named after people

References

Awards established in 2008
Awards of the Institute of Physics
Physics awards